Eleftherios Katsaitis (1929 – 6 January 2012) was bishop of Constantinople Orthodox Church, titular bishop of Nyssa.

He was ordained a deacon in 1951 and a presbyter in 1956. On 6 February 1987 he was consecrated titular Bishop of Nyssa and auxiliary bishop in the Greek Orthodox Archdiocese of Thyateira and Great Britain, a position he held until 1994. He retired in 1994 and returned to Greece.

He was smothered to death at his home in Athens on 6 January 2012. There were not signs of forced entry so the police suspects that the bishop knew his murderer.

References 
 † Ο Νύσσης Ελευθέριος (1929 – 2012): Το Βιογραφικό του...όπως το υπαγόρευσε ο ίδιος!
 Obituary in Greek

Bishops of the Ecumenical Patriarchate of Constantinople
1929 births
2012 deaths
Greek murder victims
People murdered in Greece
Bishops in the United Kingdom
Eastern Orthodox bishops in Europe